Government Degree College, Kamalpur, established in 1987, is a general degree college in Kamalpur, Tripura. It offers undergraduate courses in arts and sciences. It is affiliated to  Tripura University. 
With a view to introduce higher education and to bolster the job opportunities among the downtrodden sections of the society in the remotest Dhalai District, Government Degree College, Kamalpur, was established in 1987, directly patronized by the Government of Tripura. Since then, this college has been able to establish its name as the premier centre of higher education in this district. The college which started with a meagre number of students and still a lesser number of teachers, now boast of having around 12 hundred students and a sprawling campus area of 36.1 acres overlooking the flowing Dhalai and the green Longtharai range.
Government Degree College, Kamalpur is a UGC 2f & 12B recognized undergraduate General Degree college affiliated to Tripura University (A Central University). The college offers various undergraduate courses under science and humanities streams.

Departments

Science
Chemistry
Physics
Mathematics
Information Technology

Arts
Bengali
English
Kokborok
Sanskrit
History
Political Science
Philosophy
Education
Physical Education
Economics

Accreditation
The college is recognized by the University Grants Commission (UGC).

See also
Education in India
Education in Tripura
Tripura University
Literacy in India
List of institutions of higher education in Tripura

References

External links

Colleges affiliated to Tripura University
Educational institutions established in 1987
Universities and colleges in Tripura
1987 establishments in Tripura
Colleges in Tripura